Tess Gunty is an American novelist. Her debut novel, The Rabbit Hutch, won the 2022 National Book Award for Fiction.

Early life and education 
Gunty was born and raised in South Bend, Indiana. She graduated from the University of Notre Dame with a Bachelor of Arts in English and from New York University with a Masters in Fine Arts degree in creative writing.

Career 
Gunty's first novel, The Rabbit Hutch, was published by Knopf on August 2, 2022, and was awarded the National Book Award for Fiction in November 2022.  It received generally favorable reviews from critics. The novel also received the inaugural Waterstones Debut Fiction Prize. It was a finalist for the 2023 John Leonard Prize, awarded by the National Book Critics Circle for a first book in any genre.

Works

Books 
 2022: The Rabbit Hutch (novel)
 2023: Honeydew (forthcoming)

References 

New York University alumni
21st-century American women writers
21st-century American novelists
Year of birth missing (living people)
Living people
Writers from South Bend, Indiana
National Book Award winners
Novelists from Indiana
American women novelists
Notre Dame College of Arts and Letters alumni